Robert J. MacCoun (born October 18, 1958) is the James and Patricia Kowal Professor of Law at Stanford Law School., a Professor by courtesy in Stanford's Psychology Department, and a senior fellow at the Freeman Spogli Institute.  Trained as a social psychologist, he has published numerous studies on psychoactive drug use and policy, individual and group decision-making, distributive and procedural justice, social influence processes, and bias in the use and interpretation of research evidence by scientists, journalists and citizens.

In 2019, MacCoun received the James McKeen Cattell Fellow Award of the Association for Psychological Science, which “honors distinguished APS Members for a lifetime of outstanding contributions to applied psychological research.”  He served as Editor of the Annual Review of Law and Social Science from 2018-2021.

MacCoun's publications include "Hide Results to Seek the Truth" (with physicist Saul Perlmutter, in Nature, 2015), as well as articles in Science (1989, 1997, 2017), the New England Journal of Medicine (2015, 2018), and Psychological Review (1996, 2012), and numerous op-ed essays in various newspapers and magazines. MacCoun's book with Peter Reuter, Drug War Heresies (Cambridge, 2001) is considered a landmark scholarly analysis of the drug legalization debate. MacCoun has also written extensively on the military's "Don't Ask, Don't Tell" policy, and his publications and expert testimony on military unit cohesion were influential in the 1993 and 2010 policy debates about allowing gays and lesbians to serve openly in the US military.

Prior to joining SLS in 2014, MacCoun was a member of the faculties of the Law School and the Goldman School of Public Policy at UC Berkeley. From 1986 to 1993 he was a behavioral scientist at the RAND Corporation. In 1999, he was a Visiting Professor at Princeton University, where he launched a graduate course on psychology and public policy with Daniel Kahneman and Eldar Shafir.

References

External links

Living people
Stanford Law School faculty
Kalamazoo College alumni
Michigan State University alumni
1958 births
Annual Reviews (publisher) editors